30 Boxes is a calendaring web application created by 83 Degrees. The website is tailored towards "social media junkies".

Reception
Barry Collins of The Sunday Times appreciated the website's plain-language event adding feature, but did not appreciate that he was unable to see more than one month of events at a time. Collins was also unhappy that the website was not capable of warning him when he had two events scheduled at the same time. In a list of the best web-based calendar software for small businesses, Forbes ranked 30 Boxes second, after Google Calendar. They described 30 Boxes like “buying a new car with manual transmission and lots of extras—you don't just want to drive it, you want to fool around with it to see what it can do”.

References

External links
 

Calendaring software
Internet properties established in 2005